The Humor is a left tributary of the river Moldova in Romania. It discharges into the Moldova in Gura Humorului.

References

Rivers of Romania
Rivers of Suceava County